Mr. Gay World Philippines Organization is a non-profit organization that holds a national contest for Filipino delegates for Mr. Gay World. Wilbert Ting Tolentino was given the license to be the newest national director in January 2016. Christian Lacsamana was the first Filipino delegate appointed by Wilbert Ting Tolentino to represent the Philippines in Malta, in April 2016. He was second runner up, the first Filipino to make it that far.

Mr Gay World Australia Patrick MacDonald 2016 voluntarily withdrew from the competition. Bookmakers placed MacDonald (Surfers Paradise) as the frontrunner with odds of 1.50 and Lacsamana (Philippines) at 2.70. When Australia withdrew, Lacsamana's odds globally averaged 1.55, making him the pre-arrival frontrunner according to bookmakers following MacDonald's withdrawal.

Its mission is to 'modernize' the popular image of gay men and eradicate stereotypes from public perception. This will bridge the gap between 'people like us' from the 'others'; and to combat sexual prejudice for human equality and to continue the efforts for HIV/AIDS Early Detection Program and erase the stigma of testing and the disease. In the future, through this pageant, it will use its influence for the immediate advancement of HIV/AIDS treatment and research, and use its victors to be the voice of any medical breakthrough.

Logo 
The logo is a depiction of the National Costume worn by Wilbert Ting Tolentino, the first candidate, who won best in national costume in Whistler, Canada in 2009. The design is an archangel with wings spread apart, holding a sword that symbolizes the continuous struggle for its advocacy and purpose.

Before Tolentino 
Noemi Alberto was the national director of Mr. Gay World Philippines Inc. from 2007 until 2015. Alberto appointed Wilbert Ting Tolentino, Mr. Gay Philippines 2007 2nd runner up, to represent the Philippines for Mr. Gay World 2009 in Whistler, Canada. Tolentino bagged numerous special wards. Since 2009, the Philippine delegate got three Best in National Costumes and four Mr. Gay Popularity awards.

Titleholders 

  Declared as the winner
  Ended as a runner-up
  Ended as a semifinalist
  Received an award but was unplaced

References

Philippines organization
Beauty pageants in the Philippines
LGBT organizations in the Philippines
LGBT beauty pageants